Northfleet railway station serves the town of Northfleet in the Borough of Gravesham in Kent, England. Train services are operated by Southeastern and Thameslink.

The ticket office located on platform 2, on the 'down' side, is situated in the substantial station building. This is staffed between 06:00 - 10:00 Monday to Friday; at other times a ticket machine can be found outside the entrance, accepting card and contactless payments only.

There is no step-free access to platform 1 on the 'up' side. A foot tunnel connects the two platforms.

The station is very close to Ebbsfleet International station (the NNE entrance is only  from Northfleet's station), but passengers (using public transport) will find it far easier to access Ebbsfleet International from Gravesend or Greenhithe, as these stations are more accessible and offer easy access to Fastrack bus services.

Services

The typical off-peak service in trains per hour is:
 2 tph to London Charing Cross via 
 2 tph to  via  and 
 2 tph to 
 2 tph to  via 

References

External links

Gravesham
Railway stations in Kent
DfT Category E stations
Former South Eastern Railway (UK) stations
Railway stations in Great Britain opened in 1849
Railway stations served by Southeastern
1849 establishments in England
Railway stations served by Govia Thameslink Railway